This is a list of all the Ultra prominent peaks (with topographic prominence greater than 1,500 metres) in Japan.

See also
List of mountains in Japan

Sources
 List
 Map

Japan Ultras
Mountains of Japan
Ultras